is a Japanese professional golfer.

Sato was born in Chiba Prefecture. He turned professional in 1993.

Sato has won nine tournaments on the Japan Golf Tour and featured in the top 100 of the Official World Golf Rankings. His most successful years came in 2000 when he won four times and in 2002 when he finished second on the Japan Golf Tour money list. He also has two wins on the Japan Challenge Tour, both in 1996.

Professional wins (11)

Japan Golf Tour wins (9)

Japan Golf Tour playoff record (2–0)

Japan Challenge Tour wins (2)
1996 Kabaya Ohayo Cup, Matsugamine Open

Results in major championships

CUT = missed the half-way cut
Note: Sato only played in The Open Championship.

Results in World Golf Championships

1Cancelled due to 9/11

QF, R16, R32, R64 = Round in which player lost in match play
"T" = Tied
NT = No tournament

Team appearances
Dunhill Cup (representing Japan): 1997
Dynasty Cup (representing Japan): 2003

References

External links

Japanese male golfers
Japan Golf Tour golfers
Sportspeople from Chiba Prefecture
1970 births
Living people